Agnis Čavars (born 31 July 1986) is a Latvian basketball player for the Latvian 3x3 national team.

He represented Latvia at the 2020 Summer Olympics and together with Jeļena Ostapenko was delegation's flag bearer at the opening ceremony.  Čavars was part of the gold medal winning team that included Nauris Miezis, Kārlis Pauls Lasmanis, and Edgars Krūmiņš, and defeated the Russian Olympic Committee team 21:18 in the gold medal game.

References

External links
 
 
 
 
 

1986 births
Living people
3x3 basketball players at the 2020 Summer Olympics
Latvian men's basketball players
Latvian men's 3x3 basketball players
Medalists at the 2020 Summer Olympics
Olympic gold medalists for Latvia
Olympic medalists in 3x3 basketball
Olympic 3x3 basketball players of Latvia
People from Ķekava Municipality